High Desert Christian Academy (HDCA) (formerly known as Crook County Christian School), is a private nondenominational Christian school located in Prineville, Oregon, United States. As of 2017, the school is accredited through AdvancEd (Cognia).

History 
The school was founded originally under the name Crook County Christian School (CCCS) in 1994, affiliated with the Assembly of God church in Prineville. The school is a member of the Association of Christian Schools International since 1994.

The school reported growth in 2004 prompting the construction of a second two-story building on the property to house additional classrooms and bathrooms.

In 2010, the school's high school curriculum was discontinued, and with it, its accreditation. CCCS' staff did continue to offer tutoring to high school students enrolled to the online high school program, Insight School of Oregon. CCCS' own high school program remained closed for the next 5 years.

In 2015, the school formally separated from the Assembly of God church into its own nonprofit 501(c)(3) organization and formed its own school board. It was at this time that the school's name was changed from CCCS to High Desert Christian Academy (HDCA). After the separation, the school continued to operate from the same location on the church's property, using the same buildings and land as it had prior to the separation, but now operating under a lease agreement with the church.

HDCA reopened its high school program in 2015 following its separation from the Assembly of God church. The school later became reaccredited through AdvancEd (Cognia) in 2017.

HDCA leased the school property from the Assembly of God church from 2015 to 2022. The lease agreement was not renewed at the close of the school year in 2022, so the school changed locations. HDCA expressed plans to resume operations at new facilities for the 2022-23 school year.

References 

Christian schools in Oregon
High schools in Crook County, Oregon
Educational institutions established in 1994
Prineville, Oregon
Private high schools in Oregon
Private elementary schools in Oregon
Private middle schools in Oregon
1994 establishments in Oregon